The canton of Le Pouzin is an administrative division of the Ardèche department, southern France. It was created at the French canton reorganisation which came into effect in March 2015. Its seat is in Le Pouzin.

It consists of the following communes:
 
Baix
Cruas
Meysse
Le Pouzin
Rochemaure
Rompon
Saint-Bauzile
Saint-Julien-en-Saint-Alban
Saint-Lager-Bressac
Saint-Martin-sur-Lavezon
Saint-Pierre-la-Roche
Saint-Symphorien-sous-Chomérac
Saint-Vincent-de-Barrès

References

Cantons of Ardèche